Visibaba is a village in the municipality of Požega, western Serbia. According to the 2002 census, the village has a population of 1232 people. The Blaškovina archaeological site located in the village is part of the Cultural Heritage of Serbia list, inscribed in 1987.

References

Populated places in Zlatibor District
Požega, Serbia